Aldford Brook is a short river in Cheshire, England.  It is a tributary of the River Dee, and joins the Dee at the village of Aldford.

Rising at an altitude of around 78m, just to the south west of Malpas the stream flows generally north past Tilston and Coddington before turning north west towards Aldford. Along its way the stream is successively known as Carden Brook and Coddington Brook, and only known as Aldford Brook for its final  or so.

Tributaries include Golbourne Brook, Aldersey Brook, Mere Brook, and Hook's Brook.

An important water mill is still in operation at Stretton.

References

Rivers of Cheshire
1Aldford